Nancy Ann Nord was a commissioner of the United States Consumer Product Safety Commission (CPSC). Often the only Republican commissioner during her tenure, she served with Hal Stratton at the beginning of her tenure,  Anne Northup, and Ann Marie Buerkle near the end of her tenure.

Early career
Before joining the CPSC, Nord was the Director of Federal Government Relations for the Eastman Kodak Company. Previously, she served as general counsel to the Council on Environmental Quality at the White House, an attorney at the Federal Communications Commission, and Republican Counsel to the U.S. House of Representatives Commerce Committee, specializing in product liability and consumer protection legislation. She also practiced law at the Washington, D.C., law firm of Verner, Liipfert, Bernhard, McPherson and Hand, and served as the first executive director of the American Corporate Counsel Association.

In 2006 and 2007 Nord served as president of Executive Women in Government, a nonprofit organization for senior women government leaders. Nord has a bachelor's degree from the University of Nebraska and a law degree from George Washington University. She was born and raised in South Dakota. She is married to the Honorable James S. Halpern, a judge on the United States Tax Court.

Appointment
The U.S. Senate confirmed her appointment by President George W. Bush on April 29, 2005; she was sworn into office on May 5 of that year. From July 2006 to June 2009 Nord served as acting chairman of the agency. She was initially succeeded as acting chairman by Thomas Hill Moore—a Democrat and the only other active commissioner at the time—until President Obama's nominee for the chairman's seat, Inez Tenenbaum, was appointed and confirmed. Nord's final term concluded on October 26, 2012, and she remained on the Commission during the holdover year provided for under the Consumer Product Safety Act until October 26, 2013.

Consumer Product Safety Commission
During her time at the CPSC as Acting Chairman, Nord came under scrutiny by Members of the United States Congress and the media for the agency's recall of large numbers of toys that violated the federal lead paint ban. These recalls lead to the passage of the Consumer Product Safety Improvement Act (CPSIA) in 2008. Nord came under further attack when she raised questions about the wisdom of certain provisions of the legislation as it was being considered by Congress. She was criticized for being a defender of industry and for the slow implementation and restrictive interpretation of the new law.

Despite this criticism, Nord has time and time again admonished industry and big business to fully consider consumer safety, for example declaring before the annual International Toy Fair in February 2008, "I will not tolerate this industry or any other not complying with our regulations. This problem must be fixed. We will be relentless with recalls and there is no reason why they can't certify that every toy has been designed for safety." She also realized the safety issue of youth ATVs and mini bikes not being available for purchase because of the lead content provisions of the CPSIA. If smaller versions of these bikes were not available due to excess levels of lead, children would be forced to ride on too big adult machines. Because the risk of children getting hurt on adult sized vehicles was greater than the risk of a child getting lead poisoning from using a youth vehicle, she and Commissioner Thomas Moore voted on a stay of enforcement for this group of vehicles, meaning although the vehicles are in violation of the lead limits put forth in the CPSIA, the CPSC would not come after businesses selling them.

Nord has also stood her ground on the problems and unintended consequences of the CPSIA. She has called on Congress to address the "chaos and confusion" that has ensued from the new law and publicly criticized parts of the law itself citing ambiguous provisions, unrealistic deadlines, and lack of foresight to the impact on small business and industry.

She has voted for delays in enforcement of certain provisions of the act to give the commission time to further interpret the law and industry to come into compliance. Nord's decisions on the CPSIA were also been backed by the only other commissioner, a Democrat, and by the commission's lawyers. The first 23 commission votes on the CPSIA were unanimous with a vote of 2-0. During this time, the CPSC was struggling to implement the CPSIA due to the lack of needed funding from Congress. Nord repeatedly requested more funds to implement the law quicker and more effectively; however the resources needed were not appropriated to the agency until March 2009, leaving the agency underfunded during the critical first six months after the CPSIA was signed into law.

In response to a letter sent to the commissioners of the CPSC from Representative John Dingell, Nord requested career staff at the CPSC to respond frankly to the Congressman's ten questions of the CPSIA. The staff's top three proposed beneficial changes reaffirmed her concerns with the law. The career staff's proposed changes were:

In addition to the activity surrounding enactment and implementation of the CPSIA, under Nord's leadership, the agency initiated significant activities to address import safety including negotiating agreements with China and other exporting countries, establishing a port surveillance program, expanding the laboratory facilities of the agency and creating the first CPSC international office in Beijing.

References

External links
Nancy Nord's Blog- Conversations with Consumers

Official CPSC bio
CPSC website
Nord's statement to Senate Commerce Committee upon nomination
Executive Women in Government

Living people
U.S. Consumer Product Safety Commission personnel
Heads of United States federal agencies
American women in politics
Year of birth missing (living people)
21st-century American women